PP-172 Lahore-XXIX is a Constituency of Provincial Assembly of Punjab.

General elections 2013

General elections 2008

See also
 PP-171 Lahore-XXVIII
 PP-173 Lahore-XXX

References

External links
 Election commission Pakistan's official website
 Awazoday.com check result
 Official Website of Government of Punjab

Constituencies of Punjab, Pakistan